Kunturi (Aymara for condor, Hispanicized spelling Condori) may refer to:

 Kunturi (Condesuyos), a mountain in the Condesuyos Province and in the La Unión Province in the Arequipa Region, Peru
 Kunturi (Cusco), a mountain in the Cusco Region, Peru
 Kunturi (Ikmaqucha), a mountain near Ikmaqucha in the Puyca District, La Unión Province, Arequipa Region, Peru
 Kunturi (La Unión), a mountain in the Puyca District, La Unión Province, Arequipa Region, Peru
 Kunturi (Tarucani), a mountain in the Tarucani District, Arequipa Province, Arequipa Region, Peru

See also 
 Kunturiri (disambiguation)